A drive-by shooting is a type of assault that usually involves the perpetrator(s) firing a weapon from within a motor vehicle and then fleeing. Drive-by shootings allow the perpetrators to quickly strike their targets and flee the scene before law enforcement is able to respond. A drive-by shooting's prerequisites include access to a vehicle and a gun. The protection, anonymity, sense of power, and ease of escape provided by the get away vehicle lead some motorists to feel safe expressing their hostility toward others.

Historical conception 

The invention of the drive-by shooting is attributed to Nestor Makhno, commander of the Revolutionary Insurgent Army of Ukraine at the beginning of the 20th century. He combined horse and carriage with a machine gun in order to quickly assault targets then flee before they could properly react.

Motor vehicles offer similar concealment for transport of weapons to crime scenes in situations like the 2015 San Bernardino attack, and can simultaneously serve as getaway vehicles. Using a vehicle allows the shooter to approach the intended target without being noticed and then to speed away before anyone reacts. Drive-by shootings may result from road rage or personal disputes between neighbors, acquaintances, or strangers unrelated to gang membership.

United States 
There is no national data on the volume of drive-by shootings. National statistical databases such as the Uniform Crime Reports record the shooting outcome rather than the method. Non-gang-related drive-by shootings are not well researched, but journalistic accounts and police reports suggest that these constitute a significant proportion of the drive-by shootings to which police respond. Drive-by shootings that occur as an extreme form of road rage appear to be rather unpredictable in terms of the times and locations, but often occur in reaction to seemingly trivial events, although the underlying motivation usually appears to be a series of unrelated stressors in the perpetrator's life. A drive-by shooting's prerequisites include access to a vehicle and a gun. Recent legislation has focused on transfer of guns rather than vehicles, so those who carry out drive-by shootings may use their own vehicle or one that has been borrowed, rented, or stolen.

The primary motivations for a gang-involved drive-by include intimidation, terrorization, and assassination of rival street gang members. Such shootings are associated with gang violence in urban areas of the United States but also occur in other contexts. The tactic is also called simply a "drive-by".

History 
Motorcycle ride-by killings were a common form of murder used by drug lord Griselda Blanco during her years controlling the Miami cocaine trade routes in the late 1970s and early 1980s. Blanco herself died by this method after having been shot twice in the head by a motorcyclist in a drive-by shooting in Medellín, Colombia. Drive-by shootings are also included in the Ku Klux Klan's modus operandi.

Chicago Prohibition-era gangster and North Side Gang boss Bugs Moran was considered a "pioneer" of the drive-by shooting, with the Tommy gun being the weapon of choice. The notoriously vicious gang performed multiple shootings against their rivals, including the South Side gang led by Al Capone and the Genna brothers. Other Irish-American gangs, such as the Saltis-McErlane Gang, the Sheldon Gang, and the Southside O'Donnell's, also executed drive-bys on one another in the Chicago area. Also Al Capone had a Cadillac painted in Chicago police colors (police lights included) that the rear windshield was armored and with a small hatch to fire machine guns with the car moving. 

During the Second Philadelphia Mafia War, two warring factions fought for control of the family; one led by former alleged boss, John Stanfa; and the "Young Turks" led by up-and-coming gangster Joey Merlino. On 5 August 1993, Merlino survived a drive-by shooting assassination attempt by two Stanfa gunmen, taking four bullets in the leg and buttocks, while his friend and associate  Michael Ciancaglini was shot in the chest and killed. On 31 August 1993, a drive by shooting was performed on Stanfa and his son while they were driving on the Schuylkill Expressway. Stanfa escaped uninjured and his son survived being shot in the jaw.

In 1992, the Mexican Mafia prison gang announced an edict prohibiting Sureno gangs from committing drive-by shootings, in order to avoid police crackdowns throughout neighborhoods in southern California. Those who broke the edict were to be greenlighted for assault or even death in the California prison system.

Numerous hip hop artists have been targeted in drive-bys; prominent rappers who were killed in such incidents include Tupac Shakur, The Notorious B.I.G., Big L, Mac Dre. Other rappers, such as Obie Trice, have survived being assaulted in drive-by shootings.

On August 11, 1999, 4-time POGs championship winner Vanessa Rivas (b. January 10, 1984) was killed in a gang-related drive-by shooting while visiting her boyfriend, Latin Kings member Maximillano Castillo.  Castillo was targeted by rival gang member Arthur Lopez Jr. and an associate Luis Acevedo.  Rivas was killed by a stray bullet.   

In 2015, Jorja Leap, an UCLA anthropologist studying gang culture, pointed out how drive-by shooting tactics are being replaced by the "walk-up shooting" method, because murders have become more targeted and while driving, there is low accuracy in aiming.

Italy 
In Italy the circulation of firearms is low compared to that in the United States, and just over a million civilians own a firearm license, so face-to-face shooting or threats with firearms are rare. Drive-by shooting is then common especially in professional criminal context as the statistical incidence says that almost all assaults with firearms are carried out with a running car or moped—this kind of vehicle is used for reasons of better mobility in the narrow city districts. From the 1970s into the 21st century, the Camorra have been known for performing drive-by shootings during clan or gang wars, or to execute targeted murders.

One of the most striking episodes of a drive-by shooting in Italy was the Macerata shooting, conducted against six Africans by a far-right extremist, Luca Traini, using an Alfa Romeo 147. However, the attack caused no deaths.

Syrian and Iraqi civil wars 
In the first decade of the 21st century, drive-by shootings were also used for assassinations by militants in Iraq, including that of the Waldemar Milewicz and Hatem Kamil. and in Syria.

See also 
 Tachanka
 Cantabrian circle
 Caracole
 Shoot-and-scoot
 Hit and run
 Car bomb

References

External links 
 BBC article on 17 November shooting
 Database of Iraqi civilian casualties

Drive-by
 
Gangs
Guerrilla warfare tactics
Urban decay